Ancarolol is a beta blocker.

References

Beta blockers
Antihypertensive agents
2-Furyl compounds
Anilides
N-tert-butyl-phenoxypropanolamines